Karl Klug (born March 31, 1988) is a former American football defensive end who played his entire seven-year professional career with the Tennessee Titans of the National Football League. He played college football at Iowa.

College career
During his four-year career at Iowa, Klug appeared in 40 games with 26 consecutive starts to end his career. He tallied 140 tackles, including 31 for loss, 9.5 sacks, eight quarterback pressures, eight passes defensed, four forced fumbles and a fumble recovery.

Professional career
Klug was drafted by the Tennessee Titans in the fifth round of the 2011 NFL Draft, 142nd overall. In the 2011 NFL Season, Klug led all rookie defensive tackles with 7 sacks, which exceeded initial expectations.

On March 13, 2015, Klug and the Titans agreed to a two-year contract extension.

In 2016, Klug appeared in 14 games with three starts recording 26 tackles, 1.5 sacks, and one pass defensed before suffering a torn Achilles in Week 15 and was placed on injured reserve.

On March 9, 2017, Klug re-signed with the Titans.

On March 17, 2018, Klug was released by the Titans.

Coaching career
In 2018, Klug was hired as a defensive line coach at Page High School in Franklin, Tennessee, having previously volunteered with the school during his playing career.

References

External links
Tennessee Titans bio
Iowa Hawkeyes football bio
NFL.com bio

1988 births
Living people
Players of American football from Wisconsin
American football defensive tackles
American football defensive ends
Iowa Hawkeyes football players
Tennessee Titans players
People from La Crosse, Wisconsin
High school football coaches in Tennessee
Ed Block Courage Award recipients